Moreetsi Mosimanyana is a Botswana footballer who currently plays for Notwane FC. He has won one cap for the Botswana national football team.

See also
Football in Botswana

References

External links

Living people
Botswana footballers
Botswana international footballers
Notwane F.C. players
Association footballers not categorized by position
Year of birth missing (living people)